Henry Hattersley (3 April 1812 – 23 January 1835) was an English first-class cricketer.

Hattersley was born at Sheffield in April 1812. He played first-class cricket on three occasions in 1834, playing twice for Yorkshire against Norfolk at Norwich and Sheffield, in addition to playing once for Sheffield (aka Yorkshire) against Nottingham. He scored 41 runs in his three matches, in addition to taking 7 wickets. Hattersley died the following year in January 1835.

References

External links

1812 births
1835 deaths
Cricketers from Sheffield
English cricketers
Yorkshire cricketers
Sheffield Cricket Club cricketers